Mr. M is the eleventh studio album by American band Lambchop, released on February 21, 2012. Pitchfork Media ranked Mr. M #50 on its list of the top 50 albums of 2012.

Track listing
 "If Not I'll Just Die"
 "2B2"
 "Gone Tomorrow"
 "Mr. Met"
 "Gar"
 "Nice Without Mercy"
 "Buttons"
 "The Good Life (is wasted)"
 "Kind Of"
 "Betty's Overture"
 "Never My Love"

References

2012 albums
Lambchop (band) albums
Merge Records albums